The Price Is Right may refer to one of the following television game shows:
In the United States and Canada:
The Price Is Right (1956 U.S. game show)
The Price Is Right (U.S. game show), the version currently on air
The New Price Is Right (1994 game show)
The Price Is Right Live!, a Las Vegas casino show
In Australia:
The Price Is Right (Australian game show)
The Price Is Right (1957 Australian game show)
In the United Kingdom:
The Price Is Right (UK game show)
Elsewhere
The Price Is Right#International versions